Chen Jian Hong (born 23 August 1975) is a Taiwanese racing driver currently competing in the TCR International Series and TCR Thailand Touring Car Championship. Having previously competed in the Thailand Super Series and the RAAT 6 Hours amongst others.

Racing career
Chen began his career in 2008 in the Thailand Super Series, he raced in the S1500 class, finishing second in 2008 before winning the championship in 2009. He also won the Toyota Yaris Cup in 2009, continuing in the series in 2010, he finished second in standings that year. Switching to the Thai RAAT 6 Hours series in 2011, winning Division 2 from 2011-13. Switching to Division 1 for 2014, he won the class in both 2014 and 2015. For 2016 he switched to the all new 2016 TCR Thailand Touring Car Championship.

In August 2016 it was announced that he would race in the TCR International Series, driving a SEAT León Cup Racer for Kratingdaeng Racing Team.

Racing record

Complete TCR International Series results
(key) (Races in bold indicate pole position) (Races in italics indicate fastest lap)

References

External links
 
 

1975 births
Living people
TCR International Series drivers
Taiwanese racing drivers
Sportspeople from Taichung
Toyota Gazoo Racing drivers
Nürburgring 24 Hours drivers